Petia Lyubomirova Miladinova (born January 10, 1962) is a Bulgarian actress.

Early life
She comes from a family of actors. Her father is the actor Lyubomir Miladinov, known for his act as the black captain in "Na vseky kilometur" (On every mile), and her mother is the actress Nadya Savova. Petia graduated NATFIZ (National Academy of Theater and Film Arts in Sofia, Bulgaria) as an actress.

Acting career
She played in a theater in Shumen and also for about two years in Haskovo. Later on she started acting in the "Tears and Laughter" theatre. She is acofounder of the "Dialogue" theater. She has played in "Thessaloniki conspirators," "In the Moon Room", "Confusion", "That's absurd," "The Importance of Being Earnest", etc. and participated in numerous theatrical performances of festival projects in countries of Europe such as Hungary (Budapest and Szeged), Georgia, Uzbekistan (Tashkent), Russia (Yaroslavl) Italy (Urbino and Rome), France (Avignon) and Romania (Iași).

Voice acting career
Miladinova deals with dubbing films and TV shows. Her first dubbing job was on Russian animated series (she was six years old then). Later on she also dubbed the same movies she acts in. She started dubbing actively after the popular series "Alf". More popular titles with her voice are "Mad About You", "Absolutely Fabulous", "Babylon 5" (second dubbing), "Cybill" (second dubbing) "Doctor Who", "That '70s Show", "Monk" (from season 7), "Two and a Half Men" (from season 2), "Ghost Whisperer" (from season 2), "'Til Death", "Fringe", "Stargate Universe", "Drop Dead Diva", "Suits", and more. Animated series with her participation are "Disney's Adventures of the Gummi Bears" and "Superman: The Animated Series", as well as the second dubbes of "Teen Titans" and "Duck Dodgers".

Other activities
In 2000 she teaches Acting in the private school "Tour défors". She is the author and performer of a performance on The First Theoretical Lecture on History of the Ancient Theater .

Miladinova also deals with writing poems. Some of her poems "If Someone Dies" were released on Radio Free Europe in the late 1980s, and some of them were published in The Literary Journal.

He wrote the children's book "Fairy Riddles", which was published in 2003. Later, she performed a performance of the same name with the play of Jana Dobreva based on the booklet.

In 2004 she teaches at the Private Theater School for "Children Deprived of Parental Care" at the House "P. Slaveykov ".

Awards and nominations
She took a special part in the book "The Magic City" by Kiril Milchev, who received the 2001 Independent Writers Association Award.

In 2002, she received a second prize for a screenplay competition "Studio on the Fifth Floor" in the category Situational Comedy, organized by the National Film Center and the Dolly Media Studio.

In 2003 her play "Flower Hill" was nominated for the National Drama Competition "Ivan Radoev" and was selected in the Dramaturgy section of the Drumevi Fests Festival. Later in 2009 and 2010, Colorful Hill was ranked third in the National Film Center competition in the animation section.

Miladinova is included in Anthology Writing actors "Written in Antract" in 1998, as well as in Almanac "Irin Pirin" in 2003.

In 2011, Miladinova was awarded the National Drama Award for the Mikhail Lakatnik Puppet Theater Festival - Yambol for the play "Feng and the Sky Dragon".

That same year the play "The Papyrus of Tot" was nominated for a competition for child radio broadcast at BNR "Hristo Botev".

Personal life
She has one son – Branimir Miladinov. In her spare time Petia takes care of several tropical birds called gouldian finches.

Film and TV appearances

Theater appearances
 "The Thessaloniki Consul" by Georgi Danailov
 "Viewpoint" by Vasily Shuxhin
 "In the Moon Room" by Valeri Petrov
 The Squid by Nicolas Erdman
 "Sumathoha" by Yordan Radichkov
 "This one who gets slapped" by Leonid Andreev
 "Euphonal Wedding" by Bertolt Brecht
 "Bing"
 "Bit" by Ivan Hadjiyski
 "This is absurd" by Ivan Kulekov
 "Gonzago's murder" by Nedyalko Yordanov
 "How Important to Be Serious" by Oscar Wilde
 "Trample Desire " by Tennessee Williams
 "Cinderella" by M. Minkov
 "Vishneva Garden" by Anton Chekhov

Plays, recorded in a Theater Author

References

External links
 
 
 

1962 births
Living people
20th-century Bulgarian actresses
Actresses from Sofia
Bulgarian stage actresses
Bulgarian film actresses
Bulgarian television actresses
Bulgarian voice actresses